WEpods was a Dutch public transportation system and the world's first self-driving electric shuttle to be implemented at scale. In 2019, the experiment was terminated at the buses sold, after the province Gelderland cancelled its funding. The WEpods never ran between  Ede-Wageningen railway station  and the campus of Wageningen University and Research, as planned, but only transported people across the campus.

References 

 http://www.curbed.com/2016/3/17/11253500/driverless-car-autonomous-vehicle-wepod-bus
 https://www.telegraph.co.uk/technology/2016/01/28/first-driverless-buses-travel-public-roads-in-the-netherlands/
 https://www.theguardian.com/technology/2016/jan/28/driverless-bus-trial-in-netherlands-will-be-first-on-public-roads

Public transport in the Netherlands
Self-driving cars